Arabela may refer to:

 Arabela language, native to Peru
 Arabela (TV series), Czech children's television series (1979-81)
 Arabela, New Mexico, an unincorporated community in New Mexico, United States
 Greco-Roman name for the Iraqi-Kurdistan capital city of Erbil

See also
 Arabella (disambiguation)

 Arbela (disambiguation)